The Louisiana Tech Bulldogs college football team competes in the National Collegiate Athletic Association (NCAA) Division I Football Bowl Subdivision, representing Louisiana Tech University in Conference USA. Louisiana Tech has played their home games at Joe Aillet Stadium in Ruston, Louisiana since 1968. Since Louisiana Tech's first season in 1901, the Bulldogs lay claim to three National Championships, 25 conference championships, two conference division championships, 13  bowl berths, and four undefeated, untied seasons. As of the 2022 regular season, the Louisiana Tech football program has posted 641 all-time wins and an all-time winning percentage of .568. Currently, the Bulldogs are coached by Sonny Cumbie.

Seasons

Official record as of November 28, 2022.

Notes

References

Louisiana Tech

Louisiana Tech Bulldogs football seasons